Faithfully is an album by American pop singer Johnny Mathis that was released on December 21, 1959, by Columbia Records and continues his trend toward covering ballads alongside an orchestra. While his previous LPs usually offered one or two songs that had not been previously recorded, that number on this project leaped to five, and although the other seven selections were established by other artists, even some of those were lesser-known, such as Jeri Southern's number 30 pop hit "You Better Go Now" and the title song from the 1953 film The Blue Gardenia.

The album made its first appearance on Billboard magazine's album chart in the issue dated January 18, 1960, and reached number two during its 75 weeks there. It received Gold certification from the Recording Industry Association of America for sales of 500,000 copies in the US on December 4, 1962.

The Mathis recording of the West Side Story number "Maria" was released as a single on two occasions. The first came five months after Faithfully hit store shelves and included four weeks on the Billboard Hot 100 that began in the issue dated May 30 and led to a number 78 peak position. The second followed the 1961 release of the film version of West Side Story and resulted in a number 88 showing during its three weeks on that same chart in December of that year.

Faithfully was released for the first time on compact disc on June 21, 2002, as one of two albums on one CD, the other LP being his 1960 follow-up Johnny's Mood.

Reception
Billboard wrote, "The arrangements by Glenn Osser are lush and warm, and Mathis has never been in better voice."

Track listing

Side one
"Faithfully" (Burt Bacharach, Sidney Shaw) – 2:37
"Tonight" from West Side Story  (Leonard Bernstein, Stephen Sondheim) – 3:15
"Nobody Knows (How Much I Love You)" (Bart Howard) – 4:14
"One Starry Night" (Abner Silver, Sid Wayne) – 4:23
"Follow Me" (Kay Thompson) – 3:24
"You Better Go Now" (Irvin Graham, Bickley Reichner) – 4:14

Side two
"Secret Love" from Calamity Jane (Paul Francis Webster, Sammy Fain) – 3:33
"Maria" from West Side Story (Bernstein, Sondheim) – 3:50
"Where Do You Think You're Going" (Bart Howard) – 4:04
"And This Is My Beloved" from Kismet (Bob Wright, George Forrest) – 4:01
"Where Are You" from Top of the Town (Harold Adamson, Jimmy McHugh) – 3:31
"Blue Gardenia" from The Blue Gardenia (Lester Lee, Bob Russell) – 4:27

Recording dates
From the liner notes for The Voice of Romance: The Columbia Original Album Collection:
November 4, 1959 – "Blue Gardenia", "Secret Love", "Where Are You", "You Better Go Now"
November 5, 1959 – "And This Is My Beloved", "Nobody Knows (How Much I Love You)", "One Starry Night", "Where Do You Think You're Going"
November 6, 1959 – "Faithfully", "Follow Me", "Maria", "Tonight"

Personnel
Johnny Mathis – vocals
Mitch Miller – producer
Glenn Osser – arranger and conductor
Bob Cato – photography

References

Bibliography

External links
Johnny Mathis sings "West Side Story Medley"

1959 albums
Johnny Mathis albums
Columbia Records albums
Albums arranged by Glenn Osser
Albums conducted by Glenn Osser
Albums produced by Mitch Miller